Ban Fang is a district (amphoe) of Khon Kaen province, northeastern Thailand.

History
The minor district (king amphoe) Ban Fang was established on 1 May 1975 by splitting off four tambons: Nong Bua, Pa Wai Nang, Ban Lao, and Non Khong from Mueang Khon Kaen district. On 25 March 1979 it was upgraded to a full district.

Geography
Neighboring districts are (from the north clockwise): Ubolratana, Mueang Khon Kaen, Phra Yuen, Mancha Khiri, and Nong Ruea.

Administration
The district is divided into seven sub-districts (tambons), which are further subdivided into 74 villages (mubans). The township (thesaban tambon) Ban Fang covers parts of tambon Ban Fang. There are a further seven tambon administrative organizations (TAO).

References

External links
amphoe.com

Ban Fang